The Solent Devils are a  professional  English ice hockey team based in Gosport, Hampshire. They are members of the NIHL South Division 1. They play their games at Gosport Ice Arena. Alexander Cole is currently the captain and Alex Murray is the head coach. They are most renowned for winning the 2011/12 title with 5 games to spare.

The Devils were founded in 2003 (Solent & Gosport Sharks 2003-2007, Solent & Gosport Devils 2007-2014, Solent Devils 2014-present).

Club roster 2022-23
(*) Denotes a Non-British Trained player (Import)

2021/22 Outgoing

External links
 Solent Devils official site

Ice hockey teams in England